Ratansinh Magansinh Rathod, also known as Ratan Singh, is an Indian politician and a member of parliament to the 17th Lok Sabha from Panchmahal Lok Sabha constituency, Gujarat. He won the 2019 Indian general election being a Bharatiya Janata Party candidate.

References

Living people
India MPs 2019–present
Lok Sabha members from Gujarat
Bharatiya Janata Party politicians from Gujarat
Year of birth missing (living people)